Bohemia (minor planet designation: 371 Bohemia) is a sizeable Main belt asteroid. It was discovered by Auguste Charlois on 16 July 1893 in Nice.

References

External links
 
 

Background asteroids
Bohemia
Bohemia
QSV-type asteroids (Tholen)
S-type asteroids (SMASS)
18930716